Mariusz Sordyl (born 27 November 1969) is a Polish professional volleyball coach and former player, a former member of the Poland national team. He currently serves as head coach for Epicentr-Podolyany.

Career

Honours

As a player
 National championships
 1990/1991  Polish Cup, with AZS Olsztyn
 1990/1991  Polish Championship, with AZS Olsztyn
 1991/1992  Polish Cup, with AZS Olsztyn
 1991/1992  Polish Championship, with AZS Olsztyn
 1994/1995  Polish Cup, with Legia Warsaw
 Universiade
 1991  Summer Universiade
 1993  Summer Universiade

As a coach
 National championships 
 2011/2012  Romanian Cup, with Remat Zalău
 2011/2012  Romanian Championship, with Remat Zalău
 2018/2019  Turkish Cup, with Fenerbahçe
 2018/2019  Turkish Championship, with Fenerbahçe
 2021/2022  Ukrainian Championship, with Epicentr Podolyany

Individual awards
 2001: Polish Championship – Best Scorer
 2001: Polish Championship – Best Spiker

References

External links

 
 Coach/Player profile at Volleybox.net

Living people
1969 births
People from Andrychów
Polish men's volleyball players
Polish volleyball coaches
Volleyball coaches of international teams
Polish expatriate sportspeople in France
Expatriate volleyball players in France
Polish expatriate sportspeople in Romania
Polish expatriate sportspeople in Qatar
Polish expatriate sportspeople in Turkey
Polish expatriate sportspeople in Ukraine
Resovia (volleyball) players
AZS Olsztyn players
Legia Warsaw (volleyball) players
AZS Olsztyn coaches
Fenerbahçe volleyball coaches
Outside hitters